Bagshot Football Club is a football club based in Bagshot, near Camberley in Surrey, England.

History
The club was established in 1906, and initially played in the Ascot & District League and the Woking & District League. In 1982 they moved up to Division Two of the Surrey County Intermediate League (Western) when it was expanded to three divisions. They went on to earn promotion from Division Three and Division Two in successive seasons, becoming members of Division One in 1984. In 1986–87 the club were Senior Division champions and were promoted to the Surrey Premier League.

After leaving the Surrey Premier League, Bagshot later joined to the Aldershot & District League. After winning Division Two in 2005–06 they were promoted to Division One, which they won in 2008–09, earning promotion to the Senior Division. They subsequently won the Senior Division and the Surrey Intermediate Cup in 2011–12, before going on to win both the Senior Division and Senior Division Cup double in both 2012–13 and 2013–14.

After winning the Senior Division again in 2015–16, they were promoted to Division One of the Combined Counties League.

Honours
Surrey County Intermediate League (Western)
Division One champions 1986–87
Aldershot & District League
Senior Division Champions 2011–12, 2012–13, 2013–14, 2015–16
Division One champions 2008–09
Division Two champions 2005–06
Senior Division Cup winners 2012–13, 2013–14
Surrey Intermediate Cup
Winners 2011–12

References

External links
Official website

Football clubs in England
Football clubs in Surrey
Association football clubs established in 1906
1906 establishments in England
Surrey County Intermediate League (Western)
Surrey Elite Intermediate Football League
Aldershot & District Football League
Combined Counties Football League
Fleet, Hart